Rhyacia is a genus of moths of the family Noctuidae.

Species
 Rhyacia arenacea (Hampson, 1907)
 Rhyacia caradrinoides (Staudinger, 1896)
 Rhyacia clemens (Smith, 1890)
 Rhyacia electra (Staudinger, 1888)
 Rhyacia helvetina (Boisduval, 1833)
 Rhyacia junonia (Staudinger, 1881)
 Rhyacia ledereri (Erschoff, 1870)
 Rhyacia lucipeta ([Schiffermüller], 1775)
 Rhyacia nyctymerides (O. Bang-Haas, 1922)
 Rhyacia nyctymerina (Staudinger, 1888)
 Rhyacia quadrangula (Zetterstedt, 1839)
 Rhyacia simulans (Hufnagel, 1766)

References
Natural History Museum Lepidoptera genus database
Rhyacia at funet

Noctuinae